The ruins of the Château de Bostfranchet can be found on the Bostfranchet estate in the Saillant commune of the Puy-de-Dôme département, France.

Occupied from the 12th century by the Pelet family, originally from the Narbonnais region, Bostfranchet is the cradle of the Beaufranchet (or Pelet de Beaufranchet) family.  A manor house there was fortified under Charles I, Duke of Bourbon; walls, fortified towers and ditches were built.

All that remains now  is a ruined tower of the castle.  A farm occupies the main space.  The arms of the Beaufranchet family can be seen carved into a stone well in the central courtyard.

Origin of name
From "bost" (le bois = wood) and "francha" (franc = exempt from taxes)

See also
List of castles in France
Photo
The Beaufranchet Family in French Wikipedia

References

Ruined castles in Auvergne-Rhône-Alpes
Châteaux in Puy-de-Dôme